Johann von Lamont, FRSE (13 December 1805 – 6 August 1879), born John Lamont, was a Scottish-German astronomer and physicist.

Biography 
Lamont was born at Corriemulzie near Inverey in Aberdeenshire, Scotland. The son of Robert Lamont (forester to Earl Fife) and Elizabeth Ewan, his education began at the local school in Inverey, near Braemar. In 1817 his father died and John was sent to be educated at St James' monastery (Scots Benedictine College) at Ratisbon, Germany.
He began to work in astronomy and joined the Bogenhausen Observatory, became its director in 1835, took his doctorate of philosophy in 1830 and became professor of astronomy in 1852 at Munich University.
At the observatory he undertook the task of creating a star catalog that had about 35,000 entries.

In 1845 he was elected an Honorary Fellow of the Royal Society of Edinburgh.

His most important work was on the magnetism of the Earth. He performed magnetic surveys in Bavaria and northern Germany, France, Spain, and Denmark. He discovered a magnetic decennial period (ten-year cycle) and the electric current in the Earth closing the electric "circuit" creating the magnetic field in 1850. This roughly matched the eleven-year sunspot cycle discovered by Heinrich Schwabe.

He calculated the orbits of  the moons of Uranus and Saturn, obtaining the first value for Uranus' mass. By chance he observed Neptune in 1845 and twice in 1846, but did not recognize the object as being a new planet.

He died, unmarried and without children, in Munich, Germany, on 6 August 1879. His considerable wealth was used to found scholarships in sciences. He is buried in Bogenhausen Churchyard on the edge of Munich.

Publications 

Lamont is the author of Handbuch des Erdmagnetismus (1849).

Honours 
His many honours include ForMemRS and FRSE. In 1867 he was awarded the Merit Order of the Bavarian Crown by the King of Bavaria, through which Lamont was ennobled and permitted to use the predicate "von".  The statue on his tomb in Munich has him with an open hand, into which the locals put small coins. In 1934 the Deeside Field Club erected a granite memorial cairn in his memory at Inverey, Scotland. It was unveiled by Sir James Jeans.

The following astronomical features were named in his honor:
 Lamont (Martian crater).
 Lamont (lunar crater).

References

External links

Obituaries 
 MNRAS 40 (1880) 208
 Obs 3 (1879) 155

1805 births
1879 deaths
19th-century German physicists
19th-century Scottish scientists
People from Marr
Honorary Fellows of the Royal Society of Edinburgh
Academic staff of the Ludwig Maximilian University of Munich
Foreign Members of the Royal Society
19th-century German astronomers
Magneticians
Scottish Roman Catholics
Scottish emigrants to Germany